Euxoa westermanni is a species of cutworm or dart moth in the family Noctuidae. It is found in North America.

The MONA or Hodges number for Euxoa westermanni is 10707.

Subspecies
These two subspecies belong to the species Euxoa westermanni:
 Euxoa westermanni polaris Bang-Haas, 1910
 Euxoa westermanni westermanni

References

Further reading

 
 
 

Euxoa
Articles created by Qbugbot
Moths described in 1857